Lauren Renee Down (born 7 May 1995) is a New Zealand cricketer who currently captains Auckland, as well as playing for New Zealand. She made her Women's One Day International cricket (WODI) debut for New Zealand Women against the West Indies Women on 4 March 2018. In January 2020, she was named in New Zealand's Women's Twenty20 International (WT20I) squad for their series against South Africa. Later the same month, she was named in New Zealand's squad for the 2020 ICC Women's T20 World Cup in Australia. She made her WT20I debut for New Zealand, against South Africa, on 9 February 2020.

In February 2022, she was named in New Zealand's team for the 2022 Women's Cricket World Cup in New Zealand. However, Down was ruled out of New Zealand's squad after suffering an injury during the fifth WODI match against India. In June 2022, Down was named in New Zealand's team for the cricket tournament at the 2022 Commonwealth Games in Birmingham, England, but was later ruled out of the tournament.

References

External links
 
 

1995 births
Living people
New Zealand women cricketers
New Zealand women One Day International cricketers
New Zealand women Twenty20 International cricketers
Cricketers from Auckland
Auckland Hearts cricketers
Oxfordshire women cricketers
Perth Scorchers (WBBL) cricketers
New Zealand expatriate sportspeople in England
New Zealand expatriate sportspeople in Australia